Bages is a commune in the Pyrénées-Orientales department in southern France.

Geography

Localisation 
Bages is located in the canton of La Plaine d'Illibéris and in the arrondissement of Perpignan.

Government and politics

Mayors

Population

See also
Communes of the Pyrénées-Orientales department

References

Communes of Pyrénées-Orientales